John A. Catsimatidis Jr. is the Executive Vice President and Chief Investment Officer of Red Apple Group, a company founded by his father, John A. Catsimatidis.

Early life and education 
Catsimatidis attended New York University, majoring in finance and management and graduating in 2015. While attending, Catsimatidis was the president of his university's College Republicans chapter. From February 2014 to April 2016, he was the chairman of the New York Federation of College Republicans. As chairman, he was noted for civilly disagreeing with his father about the 2014 New York gubernatorial election, with his father hosting 'Republicans for Cuomo' events, while he said that "it is my duty to help grow the Republican party," supporting Rob Astorino.

Career 
Catsimatidis was the youngest delegate from New York to attend the 2016 Republican National Convention. At 24, Gold Coast Bank named him a board member.

When asked about a future run for political office, Catsimatidis said “I’ll never run for office just to run. Only if I can truly add value to the system, I’ll definitely run.”

He now serves as a major principal for Red Apple Group, mostly active in the investment and energy divisions of the company.

References 

Living people
American people of Greek descent
New York (state) Republicans
New York University alumni
21st-century American businesspeople
Year of birth missing (living people)